Las Brujas Airport may refer to:

 Las Brujas Airport (Chile), serving Salamanca
 Las Brujas Airport (Colombia) serving Corozal
 Las Brujas Airport (Cuba) serving Las Brujas